Diana and Destiny is a 1916 British silent drama film directed by Floyd Martin Thornton and starring Evelyn Boucher, Wyndham Guise and Roy Travers. It was made at Catford Studios, and based on a 1905 novel by Charles Garvice.

Cast
 Evelyn Boucher as Diana
 Wyndham Guise as William Bourne
 Roy Travers
 Frank Petley
 Harry Royston
 Harry Agar Lyons
 Ernie Collins
 Greta Wood

References

Bibliography
 Low, Rachael. History of the British Film, 1914-1918. Routledge, 2005.

External links

1916 films
1916 drama films
British drama films
British silent feature films
1910s English-language films
Films directed by Floyd Martin Thornton
Films based on British novels
Films set in England
Films shot at Catford Studios
British black-and-white films
1910s British films
Silent drama films